The Steagle is a 1971 American comedy film based on the novel of the same name by Irvin Faust. The film was directed by Paul Sylbert and starred Richard Benjamin. The film concerns the personality change which overcomes the protagonist during the Cuban Missile Crisis of 1962, and the film's title implicitly references the transient nature of the Steagles NFL team, existing for only one brief season during a national crisis.

Paul Sylbert wrote a 1974 book, Final Cut, about his mostly unhappy experiences making the film.

Plot
During the Cuban Missile Crisis, a professor decides to live out all of his dreams, travelling across the country and taking on a different persona in each city.

Cast
 Richard Benjamin	as Harold Weiss, B.A., M.A., Ph.D.
 Chill Wills	as Tall-Guy McCoy
 Cloris Leachman	as Rita Weiss
 Jean Allison	as Florence Maguire
 Suzanne Charney	as Marcy (as Suzanne Charny)
 George Mann as Dean Briggs
 Ivor Francis	as Reverend
 Susan Tyrrell	as Louise
 Jack Bernardi	as Marty Panesh
 Susan Kussman	as Joan
 Peter Hobbs as Dr. Payne
 Joseph Bernard	as Max Levine
 Frank Christi	as Mr. Forbes
 Diane Ladd	as Mrs. Forbes
 Harold Reynolds	as Dr. Plymile  
 Warren Munson	as Man on train
 Minta Durfee      as Old Lady (uncredited)

See also
 List of American films of 1971

References

External links

1971 films
1971 comedy films
1970s comedy road movies
American comedy road movies
Films about the Cuban Missile Crisis
Films set in 1962
Embassy Pictures films
1970s English-language films
1970s American films